Doctors Icefall is an icefall at the head of Goulden Cove, Ezcurra Inlet, Admiralty Bay, King George Island. It was named by the Polish Antarctic Expedition, 1980, after its doctor teams.

References 

Icefalls of Antarctica